Charles "Chad" Irving Jones is STANCO 25 Professor of Economics at Stanford University. He studies growth theory and economic development.

Education
Jones earned his AB from Harvard University in 1989 and his PhD in economics from the Massachusetts Institute of Technology in 1993.

Academic contributions
Jones writes extensively on growth theory especially endogenous growth theory to which he contributed, inter alia, in 1995 his Jones model.

He was elected fellow of the American Academy of Arts and Sciences in 2019 and fellow of the Econometric Society in 2020.

Publications

Books

References

External links
 Literature by and about Charles I. Jones in the catalog of the German National Library
 Chad Jones - Homepage of Stanford University
 Charles I. Jones at IDEAS/RePEc

MIT School of Humanities, Arts, and Social Sciences alumni
Harvard University alumni
Stanford University faculty
American development economists
Living people
Year of birth missing (living people)
Fellows of the American Academy of Arts and Sciences
Fellows of the Econometric Society